USS Detector is a name used more than once by the U.S. Navy:

 , was a coastal minesweeper launched 29 May 1941.
 , was a minesweeper launched 5 December 1952.

United States Navy ship names